Jackline Chepngeno (born 16 January 1993) is a Kenyan long-distance runner.

Career
Chepngeno won the Under-20 bronze medal at the 2009 World Cross-Country Championships over a 6 km course, with Genzebe Dibaba of Ethiopia claiming the gold and Mercy Cherono of Kenya taking silver.

Having been out of competition for five years due to two serious leg injuries, Chepngeno finished second behind Joyce Chepkirui in the 10,000m at the Kenyan national championships in July 2015, with a time of 32.08.18.

In 2016 she won the women's section of the Nandi Tea Half Marathon, having been in fourth place at 6 km before taking the lead from 7 km and maintaining the lead position until the end. A few months later she took silver in the 10,000m at the Africa Senior Championships in South Africa with a time of 31:27:73.

Medal performances
Source: World Athletics

References

External links
World Atletics profile

Living people
1993 births
Kenyan female cross country runners
Kenyan female long-distance runners